A sand bed may refer to:

 Sand filter, a layer of sand used for filtration
 Dead sand, a term used in aquarism/fishkeeping
 Live sand, a term used in aquarism/fishkeeping